Kalampala is situated  away from Ranni Town, state of Kerala, India.
Kalampala is a small village in Ranni Taluk and Mallapalli Taluk. Villagers are mostly Christians and Hindus and are very friendly. One LP school is the only public institution here. Ranny Mallappally road is passing through this village.

It has lush green surroundings, mostly contatining rubber plantation and one beautifully waterfalls are here..

References 

Villages in Pathanamthitta district